Kelly Robert DeVries (born December 23, 1956) is an American historian specializing in the warfare of the Middle Ages. He is often featured as an expert commentator on television documentaries. He is professor of history at Loyola University Maryland and Honorary Historical Consultant at the Royal Armouries, UK.

Education 
He received his PhD in Medieval studies in 1987 from the University of Toronto, Centre for Medieval Studies.

Awards 
DeVries with co-editor Michael Livingston was named as one of the recipients of the 2017 Distinguished Book Award from the Society for Military History for their book The Battle of Crécy: A Casebook.

Selected works

 (1992) Medieval Military Technology Broadview Press.
 (1999) Joan of Arc: A Military Leader Gloucestershire: Sutton Publishing,  
 (1999) The Norwegian Invasion of England in 1066 Boydell Press, .
 (1996) Infantry Warfare in the Early Fourteenth Century Boydell Press.  
 Guns and Men in Medieval Europe
 (2002) A Cumulative Bibliography of Medieval Military History and Technology History of Warfare, Vol. 8, Brill Press.
 (2005) A Cumulative Bibliography of Medieval Military History and Technology: Update 2004 History of Warfare, Vol. 26, Brill Press (winner of the Verbruggen Prize)

Collaborations
 with Matthew Bennett, Jim Bradbury, Ian Dickie and Phyllis Jestice: (2005) Fighting Techniques of the Medieval World: AD 500-AD 1500, Amber Books, 
 (2005) The Artillery of the Dukes of Burgundy 1363-1477 (co-written Robert Douglas Smith) Boydell Press.  
 (2007) Medieval Weapons:  An Illustrated History of their Impact (co-written Robert Douglas Smith).  ABC-CLIO.  
 (2011) Rhodes Besieged, 1480-1522:  a New History (co-written Robert Douglas Smith) History Press.
 (2012) Medieval Military Technology 2nd ed. (co-written Robert Douglas Smith) University of Toronto Press.
 (2015) The Battle of Crecy:  a Casebook (co-written Michael Livingston) University of Liverpool Press. (UK)

References

External links
 Loyola University Maryland: Kelly Devries
 

Living people
American military historians
American male non-fiction writers
American medievalists
Loyola University Maryland faculty
1956 births